Estadio Cristóbal Labra opened in 1957 as Municipal Stadium, in Nueva Gerona on the Isla de la Juventud. With 5,000 seats, it is the smallest in the Cuban National Series and was the only stadium without lights.

References

Estadio Cristobal Labra
Baseball venues in Cuba
Estadio Cristobal Labra
Estadio Cristobal Labra
Sports venues completed in 1957
20th-century architecture in Cuba